General Craig may refer to:

Daniel Frank Craig (1875–1929), U.S. Army brigadier general
Edward A. Craig (1896–1994), U.S. Marine Corps lieutenant general
James Craig (Missouri soldier) (1818–1888), Union Army brigadier general of volunteers
James Henry Craig (1748–1812), British Army general
Malin Craig (1875–1945), U.S. Army general

See also
Christopher Craige (fl. 1990s–2020s), U.S. Air Force major general